Taína Caragol also known as Taína Beatriz Caragol-Barreto, is an American art historian, curator, and author. She currently serves as the curator for Latino Art and History at the National Portrait Gallery, since 2013. She previously held positions at Museum of Modern Art (MoMA) and at the Museo de Arte de Ponce.

Biography 
Caragol has a BA degree in modern languages from the University of Puerto Rico, Río Piedras and a MA degree in French studies from Middlebury College. She has a PhD in 2013 in art history from the Graduate Center, City University of New York. Her dissertation was titled, “Boom and Dust: The Rise of Latin American and Latino Art in New York Exhibition Venues and Auction Houses, 1970s–1980s”.

Since 2013, she has curator for Latino Art and History at the National Portrait Gallery in Washington, D.C. Caragol was hired in part to diversify the museum collection holdings, and to promote diversity in museum representation and American identity in exhibitions. At the time of hire, the National Portrait Gallery had a 22,000-piece collection and held less than 1% Latino, 5% Black, and less than 25% female portraits. In the first 5 years at the role, she grew the Latin representation to 2.5%, mostly with around 150 new works by Latino artists.

She previously held a position as the Latin American bibliographer for the Museum of Modern Art (MoMA) in New York City, from 2004 to 2007; and as curator of education at the Museo de Arte de Ponce in Ponce, Puerto Rico in 2010.

See also 

 Women in the art history field

Publications 
A list of select publications by Caragol:

References

External links 
 Podcast: Focusing on Ruben Salazar, with Taína Caragol, National Portrait Gallery, Smithsonian Institution

Living people
University of Puerto Rico, Río Piedras Campus alumni
Middlebury College alumni
Graduate Center, CUNY alumni
American curators
American art historians
Women art historians
Year of birth missing (living people)
American women curators